This is a list of films produced by the Tollywood (Telugu language film industry) based in Hyderabad in the year 1996.

1996

Dubbed films

References

1996
Telugu
 Telugu films
1996 in Indian cinema